The 2005–06 season was the 97th season in the existence of Bologna F.C. 1909 and the club's first season back in the second division of Italian football. In addition to the domestic league, Bologna participated in this season's edition of the Coppa Italia.

Players

First-team squad

Transfers

Pre-season and friendlies

Competitions

Overall record

Serie B

League table

Results summary

Results by round

Matches

Coppa Italia

References

Bologna F.C. 1909 seasons
Bologna